The Tirol Football Association (German: Tiroler Fussballerband; TFV) is an umbrella organization of the football clubs of the Austrian state Tyrol, Austria. The TFV was founded in 1919 and has its headquarters in Innsbruck.

The TFV is one of 9 regional organizations of the Austrian Football Association (ÖFB).

External links
  

Football in Austria
Sport in Tyrol (state)